Çöplü can refer to:

 Çöplü, Alaca
 Çöplü, Tarsus